Khaidem Vicky Meitei (born 27 February 1997) is an Indian professional footballer who plays as a midfielder for I-League club NEROCA.

Career

Khaidem Vicky Meitei came through the local system before joining the AIFF Elite Academy. He began his senior professional career with Southern Samity of Calcutta Football League.

Guwahati F.C.

On 2015–16 I-League Vicky joined Guwahati F.C. in I-League 2nd Division.

Fateh Hyderabad A.F.C.

Ather that Vicky joined on Fateh Hyderabad A.F.C in I-League 2nd Division.

Gokulam Kerala FC

In January 2017, Vicky joined the new side Gokulam Kerala FC. With Gokulam, he won the 2017–18 Kerala Premier League title.

High Quality United
In 2019, Meitei moved to Bhutan and signed with Bhutan Super League outfit High Quality United FC on loan from Real Kashmir.

TRAU
In 2020, Meitei moved back to I-League, signing with TRAU FC. The 2020–21 season became successful as they entered into the title winning fight with Gokulam Kerala and Churchill Brothers but lost their last match and finished on third position.

Career statistics

Club

Honours
Gokulam Kerala
 Kerala Premier League: 2017–18

See also
 List of Indian football players in foreign leagues

References

External links
Player profile at the-aiff.com
Player profile at ESPN

1997 births
Living people
Footballers from Manipur
Indian footballers
Association football midfielders
Real Kashmir FC players
Gokulam Kerala FC players
TRAU FC players
I-League players
AIFF Elite Academy players
Southern Samity players
Fateh Hyderabad A.F.C. players
I-League 2nd Division players
NEROCA FC players
Indian expatriate footballers
Expatriate footballers in Bhutan